Neptis rothschildi is a butterfly in the family Nymphalidae. It is found in the Kisangani region of the Democratic Republic of the Congo.

References

Butterflies described in 1921
rothschildi
Endemic fauna of the Democratic Republic of the Congo
Butterflies of Africa